The Jimmy George Sports Hub, formerly known as the Jimmy George Indoor Stadium, is a stadium in Vellayambalam, Thiruvananthapuram, Kerala, India. It was constructed in 1987.

Promising players in Badminton (Shuttle) undergo regular practice in this stadium under a coach from Sports Authority of India. Training in Gymnastics and Taekwondo are also conducted here. Facilities are also here for playing Table Tennis, Volleyball, Basketball and Handball in the Stadium. The hub has a first-rate gym and a swimming pool as well. The gym is the largest one in Kerala. A specialised section is Astra, the first altitude-simulated training facility in South India, which enables high altitude acclimatisation.

References

Indoor arenas in Kerala
Indoor arenas in India
Sports venues in Thiruvananthapuram
Basketball venues in India
Volleyball venues in India
Handball venues in India
Sports venues completed in 1987
1987 establishments in Kerala
20th-century architecture in India